František Sušil (14 June 1804 in Rousínov, Moravia - 31 May 1868 in Bystřice pod Hostýnem) was a Moravian Roman Catholic priest most noted for his published collection of traditional Moravian folk music, Moravské národní písně, which contained 2091 songs and 2361 texts. Composers who have used Sušil's melodies include Antonín Dvořák, Leoš Janáček, Vítězslav Novák and Bohuslav Martinů.

External links

1804 births
1868 deaths
People from Rousínov
19th-century Czech Roman Catholic priests
Czech folklorists
Czech folk-song collectors
Czech translators
Czech poets
Czech male poets
19th-century translators
19th-century poets
19th-century male writers
19th-century musicologists